Glenwood is a census-designated place in Catron County, New Mexico, United States. As of the 2010 census it had a population of 143. The area was founded in 1878 as Bush Ranch.

Demographics

History
The first house was built in Glenwood in 1878 on the Bush Ranch, later renamed White Water for the creek that runs through it. When it was a stage stop the town was called Glenwood Springs, and in 1901 the town was formally named Glenwood. New Mexico's first powered airplane flight happened in 1909 near Glenwood.

In the 1930s Glenwood was the site of several mild earthquakes.

The Catwalk

In 1889 silver and gold was discovered in the Mogollon Mountains above Whitewater Canyon, just east of Glenwood. Several mines were developed, and ore was hauled in wagons to a mill at the mouth of the canyon. The town of Graham was founded in the mountains, and water was needed to operate the electric generators. It came from a pipeline reaching up into the canyon, and was held onto the rock walls of the canyon with timbers and iron bars that were in constant need of maintenance. Workmen dubbed it the Catwalk, and today it is operated as part of the Glenwood Ranger District of the Gila National Forest. Today it is the site of the one-mile Catwalk National Recreation Trail, a universal access walking trail which follows the route of the old pipeline, clinging dramatically to the side of Whitewater Canyon often a dozen feet or more above Whitewater Creek.

Present
Glenwood is home to the Gila National Forest Glenwood Ranger Station and the Glenwood State Trout Hatchery.

Education
It is in the Reserve Independent School District.

The community is served by the Glenwood Public Library.

See also

 List of census-designated places in New Mexico

References

External links

Census-designated places in Catron County, New Mexico
Census-designated places in New Mexico